Oscar Kipchumba Sudi is a Kenyan politician. He is currently a member of the National Assembly for the Kapseret constituency, representing the Jubilee Party. He is part of the ruling party, UDA, and is a friend to the fifth president of Kenya, William Ruto.

Education 
Sudi attended Olympic Primary School . He later joined the matau industry as a tout then driver in the Kesses - Eldoret route. He ran for office of Member of parliament winning in 2012 general elections and in 2017 general elections however in In 2022 a case was filed in court challenging the credibility of his alleged academic level and documents. Oscar Sudi's academic documents are questionable according to investigations by EACC. His documents were nullified today.

Political career 
From 2013 to 2017 he was a member of the Departmental Committee on Lands, the Constitutional Implementation Oversight Committee and the Procedure and House Rules Committee. Since 2017 he has been a member of the Departmental Committee on Energy.

In September 2020 he was accused of hate speech towards Kenyan president Uhuru Kenyatta and a disturbance occurred when locals used logs and stones to prevent police from accessing his home to arrest him. He surrendered himself to a police station on 13 September.

Election results

References 

Year of birth missing (living people)
Living people
21st-century Kenyan politicians
Jubilee Party politicians
United Democratic Alliance (Kenya) politicians
Members of the 11th Parliament of Kenya
Members of the 12th Parliament of Kenya
Members of the 13th Parliament of Kenya